Streptomyces sulfonofaciens is a bacterium species from the genus of Streptomyces which has been isolated from soil in Nachikatsuura from the Wakayama Prefecture in Japan. Streptomyces sulfonofaciens produces the antibiotic pluracidomycin.

See also 
 List of Streptomyces species

References

Further reading

External links
Type strain of Streptomyces sulfonofaciens at BacDive -  the Bacterial Diversity Metadatabase

sulfonofaciens
Bacteria described in 1983